Breaking Bad is  an American crime drama television series created and produced by Vince Gilligan. Set and filmed in Albuquerque, New Mexico, the series follows Walter White (Bryan Cranston), an underpaid, overqualified, and dispirited high-school chemistry teacher who is struggling with a recent diagnosis of stage-three lung cancer. White turns to a life of crime and partners with a former student, Jesse Pinkman (Aaron Paul), to produce and distribute methamphetamine to secure his family's financial future before he dies, while navigating the dangers of the criminal underworld. Breaking Bad premiered on AMC on January 20, 2008, and concluded on September 29, 2013, after five seasons consisting of 62 episodes.

Among the show's co-stars are Anna Gunn and RJ Mitte as Walter's wife Skyler and son Walter Jr., and Betsy Brandt and Dean Norris as Skyler's sister Marie Schrader and her husband Hank, a DEA agent. Others include Bob Odenkirk as Walter's and Jesse's lawyer Saul Goodman, Jonathan Banks as private investigator and fixer Mike Ehrmantraut, and Giancarlo Esposito as drug kingpin Gus Fring. The final season introduces Jesse Plemons as the criminally ambitious Todd Alquist, and Laura Fraser as Lydia Rodarte-Quayle, a cunning business executive secretly managing Walter's global meth sales for her company.

Breaking Bad first season received generally positive reviews, while the rest of its run received unanimous critical acclaim, with praise for the performances, direction, cinematography, screenplay, story, and character development. Since its conclusion, the show has been lauded by critics as one of the greatest television series of all time. It had fair viewership in its first three seasons, but the fourth and fifth seasons saw a moderate rise in viewership when it was made available on Netflix just before the fourth season premiere. Viewership increased more drastically upon the premiere of the second half of the fifth season in 2013. By the time that the series finale aired, it was among the most-watched cable shows on American television. The show received numerous awards, including 16 Primetime Emmy Awards, eight Satellite Awards, two Golden Globe Awards, two Peabody Awards, two Critics' Choice Awards, and four Television Critics Association Awards. Cranston won the Primetime Emmy Award for Outstanding Lead Actor in a Drama Series four times, while Aaron Paul won the Primetime Emmy Award for Outstanding Supporting Actor in a Drama Series three times; Anna Gunn won the Primetime Emmy Award for Outstanding Supporting Actress in a Drama Series twice. In 2013, Breaking Bad entered the Guinness World Records as the most critically acclaimed TV show of all time.

The series gave rise to the larger Breaking Bad franchise. Better Call Saul, a prequel series featuring Odenkirk, Banks, and Esposito reprising their Breaking Bad roles, as well as many others in guest and recurring appearances, debuted on AMC on February 8, 2015, and concluded on August 15, 2022. A sequel film, El Camino: A Breaking Bad Movie, starring Paul was released on Netflix and in theaters on October 11, 2019.

Premise
Set in Albuquerque, New Mexico, between 2008 and 2010, Breaking Bad follows Walter White, a modest high school chemistry teacher who transforms into a ruthless kingpin in the local methamphetamine drug trade, driven to financially provide for his family after being diagnosed with inoperable lung cancer. Initially making only small batches of meth with his former student Jesse Pinkman in a rolling meth lab, Walter and Jesse eventually expand to make larger batches of special blue meth that is incredibly pure and creates high demand. Walter takes on the name "Heisenberg" to mask his identity. Because of his drug-related activities, Walter eventually finds himself at odds with his family, the Drug Enforcement Administration (DEA) through his brother-in-law Hank Schrader, the local gangs, and the Mexican drug cartels (including their regional distributors), putting him and his family's lives at risk.

Cast and characters

Main characters
 Bryan Cranston as Walter White, a high-school chemistry teacher who, shortly after his 50th birthday, is diagnosed with Stage III lung cancer and turns to making meth to secure his family's finances. As his shady business progresses, Walter gains a notorious reputation under the alias of "Heisenberg". Cranston stated that, though he enjoyed doing comedy, he decided he 
 Anna Gunn as Skyler White, Walter's wife who was pregnant with their second child before his diagnosis and who becomes increasingly suspicious of her husband after he begins behaving in unfamiliar ways. Gunn sees Skyler as "grounded, tough, smart and driven". Gunn sees Skyler's stalled writing career as her biggest dream, saying, "I think she really deep down yearns to be an artist and to be creative and productive."
 Aaron Paul as Jesse Pinkman, Walter's cooking partner and former student. Paul sees Jesse as a funny kid. "He's just this lost soul – I don't think he's a bad kid, he just got mixed in the wrong crowd." Paul elaborated on the character's background, saying, "He doesn't come from an abusive, alcoholic background. But maybe he just didn't relate to his father, maybe his father was too strict and too proper for Jesse." Paul compared the character's relationship with Walt to The Odd Couple.
 Dean Norris as Hank Schrader, Marie's husband, Walter and Skyler's brother-in-law and a DEA agent. At the beginning of the series, Hank was intended to be the "comic relief". Norris, who has played several policemen before in film and television, stated: 
 Betsy Brandt as Marie Schrader, Skyler's sister and Hank's kleptomaniac wife. Brandt described Marie as "an unpleasant bitch", but also stated there was more to her than that. "I think we're seeing more of it now that she would be there for her family. But it's all about her."
 RJ Mitte as Walter White, Jr., Walter and Skyler's son, who has cerebral palsy. He begins lashing out after Walter's cancer announcement. Like Walter Jr., Mitte has cerebral palsy, although his is a milder form. Mitte stated he had to regress from his therapy to portray the character, staying up late into the night to slur his speech and learning to walk on crutches so his walking would not look fake.
 Giancarlo Esposito as Gustavo "Gus" Fring (seasons 3–4; guest season 2), a Chilean high-level drug distributor who has a cover as an owner of the fast-food chain Los Pollos Hermanos. Esposito stated that for the third season, he incorporated his yoga training in his performance. 
 Bob Odenkirk as Saul Goodman (seasons 3–5; recurring season 2), a crooked strip mall lawyer who represents Walt and Jesse. Odenkirk drew inspiration for Goodman from film producer Robert Evans. 
 Jonathan Banks as Mike Ehrmantraut (seasons 3–5A; guest season 2), works for Gus as an all-purpose cleaner and hitman, and also works for Saul as a private investigator. The character of Mike has been compared to Harvey Keitel's Winston Wolf character in Pulp Fiction, which Banks says he is not trying to emulate: "I immediately tried to put it out of my mind, quite honestly. His cleaner ain't my cleaner. But throughout this world, you would suspect there had been a great many cleaners, whether government-run or individual contractors."
 Laura Fraser as Lydia Rodarte-Quayle (season 5B; recurring season 5A), a high-ranking employee of Madrigal Electromotive and a former associate of Gus Fring. She reluctantly begins supplying Walt and Jesse with methylamine and helps Walt expand his operation overseas.
 Jesse Plemons as Todd Alquist (season 5B; recurring season 5A), an employee of Vamonos Pest Control who becomes an associate of Walt and Jesse.

Recurring characters
 Steven Michael Quezada as Steven "Gomey" Gomez – Hank's DEA partner and best friend who assists in tracking down and learning the identity of Heisenberg. In comical situations between him and Hank, Gomez serves as the "straight man".
 Matt Jones as Brandon "Badger" Mayhew – Jesse's drug-addicted, dimwitted friend who often serves as the series' comic relief.
 Charles Baker as Skinny Pete – A friend of Jesse and a fellow pusher.
 Rodney Rush as Christian "Combo" Ortega – Also a friend of Jesse and a fellow pusher.
 Jessica Hecht and Adam Godley as Gretchen and Elliott Schwartz – Co-owners of Gray Matter, a company that they co-founded alongside Walter, who left the business prior to its major success. Gretchen was a former flame of Walt's and partially the reason he left.
 Raymond Cruz as Tuco Salamanca – A sociopathic Mexican drug kingpin who becomes Walt and Jesse's meth distributor.
 Mark Margolis as Hector Salamanca – A former high-ranking member of the Juarez Cartel who is now unable to walk or speak because of a stroke, communicating with the help of a bell. He is the uncle of Tuco, Marco, and Leonel Salamanca.
 Christopher Cousins as Ted Beneke – Skyler's boss and president of Beneke Fabricators who begins developing financial problems, resulting in an intervention from Skyler.
 Krysten Ritter as Jane Margolis – Jesse's apartment manager and girlfriend, who is a recovering addict.
 John de Lancie as Donald Margolis – Jane Margolis' father, an air traffic controller. 
 David Costabile as Gale Boetticher – A chemist hired by Gus Fring to work alongside Walter.
 Daniel Moncada and Luis Moncada as Leonel and Marco Salamanca – Two ruthless and taciturn hitmen for the Juarez Cartel who are the cousins of Tuco Salamanca and the nephews of Hector Salamanca.
 Javier Grajeda as Juan Bolsa – A high-ranking member of the Juarez Cartel who acts as the mediator between the Salamancas and Gus Fring.
 Emily Rios as Andrea Cantillo – Jesse's second girlfriend, who is also a recovering addict. She has a young son named Brock.
 Jeremiah Bitsui as Victor – A loyal henchman to Gus who serves as his enforcer along with Mike.
 Ray Campbell as Tyrus Kitt – Gus's enforcer along with Mike during season 4.
 Lavell Crawford as Huell Babineaux – Saul's bodyguard who also handles problems Walter needs fixing.
 Tina Parker as Francesca Liddy – Saul Goodman's receptionist.
 Bill Burr as Patrick Kuby – A hired con man of Saul's who handles various sensitive tasks involving verbal intimidation, coercion, and misdirection.
 Michael Bowen as Jack Welker – Todd's uncle and the leader of the Aryan Brotherhood, a white supremacist gang.
 Kevin Rankin as Kenny – Jack's second-in-command.

Special guest appearances
 Danny Trejo as Tortuga – A Mexican cartel member and DEA informant.
 DJ Qualls as Getz – An Albuquerque police officer who brings Badger into police custody, prompting Walt to turn to Saul Goodman.
 Jim Beaver as Lawson – An Albuquerque arms dealer who obtains several guns for Walt.
 Steven Bauer as Don Eladio Vuente – The leader of the Juarez Cartel who has a history with Gus.
 Robert Forster as Ed Galbraith – A vacuum cleaner repairman whose undercover business is a new identity specialist.
 Charlie Rose as himself.

Production

Conception
Breaking Bad was created by Vince Gilligan, who had spent several years writing the Fox series The X-Files. Gilligan wanted to create a series in which the protagonist became the antagonist. "Television is historically good at keeping its characters in a self-imposed stasis so that shows can go on for years or even decades," he said. "When I realized this, the logical next step was to think, how can I do a show in which the fundamental drive is toward change?" He added that his goal with Walter White was to turn him from Mr. Chips into Scarface. Gilligan believed the concept of showing the full drastic transformation of a character across the run of a television show was a risky concept and would be difficult to pitch without other powerful factors to support it, such as strong cinematography and acting.

The show's title is a Southern colloquialism meaning, among other things, "raising hell", and was chosen by Gilligan to describe Walter's transformation. According to Time entertainment editor Lily Rothman, the term has a broader meaning and is an old phrase which "connotes more violence than 'raising hell' does ... [T]he words possess a wide variety of nuances: to 'break bad' can mean to 'go wild', to 'defy authority', and break the law, to be verbally 'combative, belligerent, or threatening' or, followed by the preposition 'on', 'to dominate or humiliate'."

The concept emerged as Gilligan talked with his fellow X-Files writer Thomas Schnauz regarding their current unemployment and joked that the solution was for them to put a "meth lab in the back of an RV and [drive] around the country cooking meth and making money".

After writing the concept for the show and pilot, Gilligan pitched it to Sony Pictures Television, who became very interested in supporting it. Sony arranged for meetings with the various cable networks. Showtime passed on this, as they had already started broadcasting Weeds, a show with similarities to the premise of Breaking Bad. While his producers convinced him that the show was different enough to still be successful, Gilligan later stated that he would not have gone forward with the idea had he known about Weeds earlier. Other networks like HBO and TNT also passed on the idea, but eventually FX took interest and began initial discussions on producing the pilot. At the same time, FX had also started development of Dirt, a female-centric crime-based drama series, and with three existing male-centric shows already on the network, FX passed up Breaking Bad for Dirt.

One of Gilligan's agents spoke to Jeremy Elice, the director of original programming for AMC who was looking for more original shows to add alongside their upcoming Mad Men. Elice was intrigued, and soon a meeting was set up between Gilligan, Elice, and two programming executives. Gilligan was not optimistic about this meeting, fearing they would just put him off, but instead all three showed great interest, and the meeting ended up establishing how AMC would acquire the rights from FX and set the pilot into production. It took about a year following this meeting before Sony had set up the rights with AMC and production could start.

Development history

The network ordered nine episodes for the first season (including the pilot), but the 2007–08 Writers Guild of America strike limited the production to seven episodes, as well as delaying the start of production for the second season. Within the original nine-episode arc, Gilligan had planned to kill off Jesse or Hank, as a "ballsy" moment to end the season on. This death was eliminated with the limited episode count, which Gilligan found to be a net positive given the strength of acting that both Paul and Norris brought to these roles through the seasons. The strike also helped to slow down production long enough for Gilligan and his writing team to readjust the pacing of the show, which in the original arc had been moving too quickly. Gould stated that the writer's strike "saved the show", as if they had produced the two additional episodes in the first season, they would have gone down a different creative path that he believes would have led to the show's cancellation by its third season.

The initial versions of the script were set in Riverside, California, but at the suggestion of Sony, Albuquerque was chosen for the production's location due to the favorable financial conditions offered by the state of New Mexico. Once Gilligan recognized that this would mean "we'd always have to be avoiding the Sandia Mountains" in shots directed toward the east, the story setting was changed to the actual production location. It was shot primarily on 35 mm film, with digital cameras employed as needed for additional angles, point of view shots and time-lapse photography. Breaking Bad cost $3 million per episode to produce, higher than the average cost for a basic cable program.

Around 2010, AMC had expressed to Sony Pictures Television and Gilligan that they felt that the third season would be the last for Breaking Bad. Sony started to shop the show around, having gained quick interest from the FX network for two more seasons, upon which AMC changed its mind and allowed the show to continue. At the same time, Netflix was starting to aggressively shop for content to add to its service and arranged a deal with Sony for Breaking Bad to be available after the airing of the fourth season. Knowing that AMC had placed Breaking Bad on a potential cancellation route, Sony pushed to have the show added to the service in time for the fourth season. Breaking Bads viewership grew greatly as viewers binged the series on Netflix, helping to assure that a fifth season could be made. The fifth-season premiere had more than double the viewership compared to the fourth season premiere, attributed to the Netflix availability. Gilligan thanked Netflix at the Emmy Awards in September 2013 after the series' conclusion for the popularity of the series, saying that Netflix "kept us on the air".

As the series progressed, Gilligan and the writing staff of Breaking Bad made Walter increasingly unsympathetic. Gilligan said during the run of the series, "He's going from being a protagonist to an antagonist. We want to make people question who they're pulling for, and why." Cranston said by the fourth season, "I think Walt's figured out it's better to be a pursuer than the pursued. He's well on his way to badass."

In July 2011, Vince Gilligan indicated that he intended to conclude Breaking Bad at the end of its fifth season. In early August 2011, negotiations began over a deal regarding the fifth and possible final season between the network AMC and Sony Pictures Television, the production company of the series. AMC proposed a shortened fifth season (six to eight episodes, instead of 13) to cut costs, but the producers declined. Sony then approached other cable networks about possibly picking up the show if a deal could not be made. On August 14, 2011, AMC renewed the series for a fifth and final season consisting of 16 episodes. In April 2012, Bryan Cranston revealed that the fifth season would be split into two halves, with the first eight episodes airing in 2012, and the final eight in 2013.

Before the series finale, Gilligan said that it was difficult to write for Walter White because the character was so dark and morally questionable: "I'm going to miss the show when it's over, but on some level, it'll be a relief to not have Walt in my head anymore." Gilligan later said the idea for Walter's character intrigued him so much that he "didn't really give much thought on how well it would sell", stating that he would have given up on the premise since it was "such an odd, dark story" that could have difficulties being pitched to studios. Ultimately, Gilligan chose to end Breaking Bad with Walter's death, occurring in-story two years after he had first been diagnosed with cancer and given two years to live. Gilligan said by the end of the series, "it feels as if we should adhere to our promise that we explicitly made to our audience" from the first episode.

Casting

Breaking Bad creator Vince Gilligan cast Bryan Cranston for the role of Walter White based on having worked with him in the "Drive" episode of the science fiction television series The X-Files, on which Gilligan worked as a writer. Cranston played an anti-Semite with a terminal illness who took series co-protagonist Fox Mulder (David Duchovny) hostage. Gilligan said the character had to be simultaneously loathsome and sympathetic, and that "Bryan alone was the only actor who could do that, who could pull off that trick. And it is a trick. I have no idea how he does it." AMC officials, who were initially reluctant with the casting choice, having known Cranston only as the over-the-top character Hal on the comedy series Malcolm in the Middle, approached actors John Cusack and Matthew Broderick about the role. When both actors declined, the executives were persuaded to cast Cranston after seeing his X-Files episode.

Cranston contributed significantly to the formation and development of the Walter White persona. When Gilligan left much of Walter's past unexplained during the development of the series, the actor wrote his own backstory for the character. At the start of the show, Cranston gained 10 pounds to reflect the character's personal decline, and had the natural red highlights of his hair dyed brown. He collaborated with costume designer Kathleen Detoro on a wardrobe of mostly neutral green and brown colors to make the character bland and unremarkable, and worked with makeup artist Frieda Valenzuela to create a mustache he described as "impotent" and like a "dead caterpillar". Cranston repeatedly identified elements in certain scripts where he disagreed with how the character was handled, and went so far as to call Gilligan directly when he could not work out disagreements with the episode's screenwriters. Cranston has said he was inspired partially by his elderly father for how Walter carries himself physically, which he described as "a little hunched over, never erect, [as if] the weight of the world is on this man's shoulders." In contrast to his character, Cranston has been described as extremely playful on set, with Aaron Paul describing him as "a kid trapped in a man's body".

Aaron Paul's casting was also initially questioned by production, as Paul looked too old and too much like a "pretty boy" to be associated with meth cooking. Gilligan reconsidered Paul's skills after seeing his audition and recalling he had also had guest starred on The X-Files episode "Lord of the Flies". Gilligan originally intended for Pinkman to be killed at the end of Breaking Bads first season in a botched drug deal as a plot device to plague Walter White with guilt. However, Gilligan said by the second episode of the season, he was so impressed with Paul's performance that "it became pretty clear early on that that would be a huge, colossal mistake, to kill off Jesse". Similarly, Dean Norris had shown his ability to be a law enforcement official in The X-Files episode "F. Emasculata", and was brought on to be Hank Schrader, Walter's brother-in-law and DEA agent.

Scientific accuracy
Donna Nelson, a professor of organic chemistry at the University of Oklahoma, checked scripts and provided dialogue. She also drew chemical structures and wrote chemical equations which were used as props. According to creator Vince Gilligan,

"Because Walter White was talking to his students, I was able to dumb down certain moments of description and dialogue in the early episodes which held me until we had some help from some honest-to-God chemists," says Gilligan. According to Gilligan, Nelson "vets our scripts to make sure our chemistry dialogue is accurate and up to date. We also have a chemist with the Drug Enforcement Administration based out of Dallas who has just been hugely helpful to us." Nelson spoke of Gilligan's interest in having the science right, saying that Gilligan "said it made a difference to him."

Several episodes of Mythbusters featured attempts to validate or disprove scenes from Breaking Bad, often with Gilligan guest-starring in the episode to participate. In 2013, two scenes from the first season of Breaking Bad were put under scrutiny in a Mythbusters Breaking Bad special. Despite several modifications to what was seen in the show, both the scenes depicted in the show were shown to be physically impossible. It was shown impossible to use hydrofluoric acid to fully dissolve metal, flesh, or ceramic as shown in the episode "Cat's in the Bag...", and that while it was possible to throw fulminated mercury against the floor to cause an explosion, as in the episode "Crazy Handful of Nothin'", Walter would have needed a much larger quantity of the compound and thrown at a much faster speed, and likely would have killed all in the room. A later Mythbusters episode, "Blow It Out of the Water", tested the possibility of mounting an automated machine gun in a car as in the series finale "Felina", and found it plausible. An episode of MythBusters Jr. proved that it was impossible for an electromagnet to draw metallic objects from across a room as in the episode "Live Free or Die".

Jason Wallach of Vice magazine commended the accuracy of the cooking methods presented in the series. In early episodes, a once-common clandestine method, the Nagai red phosphorus/iodine method, is depicted, which uses pseudoephedrine as a precursor to d-(+)-methamphetamine. By the season 1 finale, Walt chooses to use a different synthetic route based on the difficulty of acquiring enough pseudoephedrine to produce on the larger scale required. The new method Walt chooses is a reductive amination reaction, relying on phenyl-2-propanone and methylamine. On the show, the phenyl-2-propanone (otherwise known as phenylacetone or P2P) is produced from phenylacetic acid and acetic acid using a tube furnace and thorium dioxide (ThO2) as a catalyst, as mentioned in episodes "A No Rough-Stuff-Type Deal" and "Más". P2P and methylamine form an imine intermediate; reduction of this P2P-methylamine imine intermediate is performed using mercury aluminum amalgam, as shown in several episodes, including "Hazard Pay".

One of the important plot points in the series is that the crystal meth Walter "cooks" has very long crystals, is very pure, and (despite its purity) has a strong cyan blue color. Pure crystal meth would be clear or white.

In their article "Die Chemie bei Breaking Bad" on Chemie in unserer Zeit (translated into English on ChemistryViews as "The Chemistry of Breaking Bad), Tunga Salthammer and Falk Harnish discuss the plausibility of the chemistry portrayed in certain scenes. According to the two, chemistry is clearly depicted as a manufacturing science without much explanation of analytical methods being provided. They also note, serious scientific subjects are mixed into the dialogue in order to show a world where chemistry plays a key role.

Technical aspects
Michael Slovis was the cinematographer of Breaking Bad, beginning with the second season, and he received critical acclaim for his work throughout the series. Critics appreciated the bold visual style adopted by the TV series. Although series creator Vince Gilligan and Slovis wanted to shoot Breaking Bad in CinemaScope, Sony and AMC did not grant them permission. Gilligan cited Sergio Leone's Westerns as a reference for how he wanted the series to look. Slovis received four Primetime Emmy Award nominations for Outstanding Cinematography for a One Hour Series and Outstanding Cinematography for a Single-Camera Series.

Breaking Bad was shot on 35 mm film because of the robustness of the equipment and to keep a focus on shooting scenes economically. It also allowed for a later digital transfer to 4K Ultra HD resolution.

Kelley Dixon was one of the few editors of Breaking Bad and edited many of the series' "meth montages". For the montages, she would use techniques such as jump cuts and alternating the speed of the film, either faster or slower. For her work, she received six Primetime Emmy Award nominations for Outstanding Single-Camera Picture Editing for a Drama Series and won the award in 2013.

Episodes

The complete series was released on DVD and Blu-ray on November 26, 2013, in a collectable box shaped like one of the barrels used by Walt to bury his money. The set contains various features, including a two-hour documentary and a humorous alternative ending that features Cranston and his Malcolm in the Middle co-star Jane Kaczmarek playing their characters Hal and Lois, in a nod to the final scene from Newhart.

Season 1 (2008)

The first season was originally intended to be nine episodes, but due to the 2007–2008 Writers Guild of America strike only seven episodes were filmed. It ran from January 20 to March 9, 2008.

Walter, diagnosed with inoperable lung cancer, conspires with Jesse to cook crystal meth to pay for his treatment and provide financial security for his family. Jesse secures an R.V. to cook in, while Walter devises a revolutionary formula using unregulated chemicals, creating a highly pure product tinted blue. After a run-in with the Mexican cartel, Walter adopts the nickname "Heisenberg" and trades his "blue sky" meth with psychotic drug lord Tuco Salamanca. The DEA and Hank, Walt's brother-in-law, become aware of Heisenberg's presence in the drug trade and begin investigating.

Season 2 (2009)

Tuco and Walter become hostile and Tuco is killed by Hank. After a failed attempt by Walter and Jesse to start their own distribution network leaves one of their dealers arrested and one murdered, Walter hires corrupt lawyer Saul Goodman, who later connects them to high-profile drug distributor Gus Fring and hitman Mike Ehrmantraut. Jesse dates his apartment manager Jane, who introduces him to heroin, making him unreliable. After selling a shipment to Gus, Walt refuses to pay Jesse his half of the money, but Jane blackmails him. Walt returns to Jesse to apologize but instead allows an unconscious Jane to choke on her own vomit. Jesse, traumatized, enters rehab. Walt seems content until he witnesses a mid-air collision of two planes; a result of Jane's father, an air-traffic controller, becoming distraught over her death while working.

Season 3 (2010)

On April 2, 2009, AMC announced that Breaking Bad was renewed for a third, 13-episode season. It premiered on March 21, 2010, and concluded on June 13, 2010. The complete third season was released on Region 1 DVD and Region A Blu-ray on June 7, 2011.

Skyler learns of Walt's crimes and seeks a divorce from him. Walt briefly retires from the drug trade, but Gus offers him a job cooking meth at a hidden lab with an assistant, Gale. Hank's investigation leads him to Jesse. He finds no evidence, but assaults Jesse and is suspended from the DEA. Walt, in order to keep Jesse from suing Hank, coerces Gus into replacing Gale with Jesse as his lab assistant. Hank is attacked by Tuco's vengeful cousins and kills them, becoming paralyzed in the aftermath. Jesse's behavior becomes erratic, and Walt is forced to kill two of Gus' drug dealers to protect Jesse. After an enraged Gus orders them killed, Walt convinces Jesse to kill Gale so Gus cannot replace them.

Season 4 (2011)

On June 14, 2010, AMC announced Breaking Bad was renewed for a fourth, 13-episode season. Production began in January 2011, the season premiered on July 17, 2011, and concluded on October 9, 2011. Originally, mini episodes of four minutes in length were to be produced before the premiere of the fourth season, but these did not come to fruition.

Gus tightens security at the lab after Gale's death. Gus and Mike drive a wedge between Walt and Jesse, coercing Jesse to be their solitary cook while at the same time eliminating the Mexican cartel. Skyler accepts Walt's meth cooking and conspires with Saul to launder the earnings. Hank, in recovery, tracks Gale's death to Gus and the drug trade. Walt tricks Jesse into turning against Gus, and convinces Hector Salamanca, the last living member of the cartel, to detonate a bomb while meeting with Gus, killing them both.

Season 5 (2012–13)

On August 14, 2011, AMC announced that Breaking Bad was renewed for a fifth and final season consisting of 16 episodes. Season five is split into two parts, each consisting of 8 episodes. The first half premiered on July 15, 2012, while the second half premiered on August 11, 2013. In August 2013, AMC released a trailer promoting the premiere of final season with Bryan Cranston reading the poem "Ozymandias" by Percy Bysshe Shelley, over timelapse shots of Breaking Bad locations.

After Gus' death, Walt, Jesse, and Mike start a new meth business. When their accomplice Todd kills a child witness during a methylamine theft, Jesse and Mike sell their share of the methylamine to Declan, another distributor. Walter produces meth for Declan, and Gus' former associate Lydia starts distribution in Europe, which is so successful that Walter earns , which he buries on the Tohajiilee Indian Reservation. After Walter kills Mike during an argument, he is given names of Mike's imprisoned men from Lydia. Walt hires Todd's uncle, Jack, and his gang to kill Mike's associates; they also kill Declan.

Hank discovers Walt is Heisenberg and begins gathering evidence. He turns to Jesse, who helps track Walt's money to the reservation. When Walt is arrested, Jack's gang arrives. They kill Hank, capture Jesse, and take most of Walt's money. Walt is forced to flee alone with the remaining money. After months in hiding, Walt plans to surrender but changes course after Elliott and Gretchen publicly minimize his involvement in starting Gray Matter. Walt manipulates Elliott and Gretchen to give his earnings to Walter Jr. once he turns 18. After poisoning Lydia, Walt admits to Skyler that he manufactured meth for his own satisfaction rather than for his family. At Jack's compound, Walter kills Jack and his gang with a remotely-controlled machine gun, and frees Jesse, who kills Todd. The two share a farewell glance before Jesse escapes. Wounded by his own weapon, Walt dies from his wounds in Jack's meth lab.

Themes

Moral consequences
In an interview with The New York Times, creator Vince Gilligan said the larger lesson of the series is that "actions have consequences". He elaborated on the show's philosophy:

In a piece comparing the show to The Sopranos, Mad Men and The Wire, Chuck Klosterman said that Breaking Bad is "built on the uncomfortable premise that there's an irrefutable difference between what's right and what's wrong, and it's the only one where the characters have real control over how they choose to live". Klosterman added that the central question of Breaking Bad is: "What makes a man 'bad' – his actions, his motives, or his conscious decision to be a bad person?" Klosterman concluded that in the world of Breaking Bad, "goodness and badness are simply complicated choices, no different than anything else".

Ross Douthat of The New York Times, in a response to Klosterman's piece, compared Breaking Bad and The Sopranos, stating that both series are "morality plays" that are "both interested in moral agency". Douthat went on to say that Walter White and Tony Soprano "represent mirror-image takes on the problem of evil, damnation, and free will". Walter is a man who "deliberately abandons the light for the darkness" while Tony is "someone born and raised in darkness" who turns down "opportunity after opportunity to claw his way upward to the light".

Devotion to family
The show explores most of the main characters' connections to their families in great detail. Walt justifies his decision to cook crystal meth and become a criminal because of his desire to provide for his family. In the third season he tries to exit the business because it has driven Skyler to leave him. Gus convinces him to stay, telling him it is a man's job to provide for his family, even if he is unloved. In the final episode of the series, Walt finally admits to Skyler that the main motivation for his endeavors in the meth business was his own interest, in spite of secretly securing the $9.72 million he had managed to salvage for her and the children. Jesse's loneliness in the early seasons of the show can be partly explained by his parents' decision to kick him out of their home due to his drug-related activities. This parental disconnect brings him closer to Jane, whose father berates her for her drug use. When Walt crosses paths with Jane's father, Walt refers to Jesse as his nephew and laments the fact that he cannot get through to him. Jane's father responds by telling him to keep trying, saying, "Family. You can't give up on them, ever. What else is there?" Jane's subsequent death, which Walt purposefully did not prevent, is a major factor in her father causing the airliner crash at the end of the second season.

Even the show's more hardened characters maintain ties to family. In the second season, Tuco Salamanca spends time caring for his physically disabled uncle, Hector. When Tuco is killed by Hank, his cousins vow revenge. Their actions are further explained in a flashback, where Hector explains to the brothers that "La familia es todo" ("Family is everything"). Gustavo Fring's franchise Los Pollos Hermanos translates to "The Chicken Brothers". This refers to the fact that the company was co-founded by Gus and a man named Max, with whom he shared a romantic relationship. When Max is killed by Hector Salamanca, Gus vows to destroy the Salamanca family and in particular to humiliate Hector and prolong and draw out his suffering. In the first part of the fifth season, it is explained that Mike Ehrmantraut's intentions for being in this business were to provide for his granddaughter's future, and by his final episode he is conflicted when having to leave her in a park by herself once he has been warned that the police are onto him. During the second part of the fifth season, white supremacist Jack Welker says "don't skimp on family", and he lets Walt live after capturing him in the desert because of love for his nephew Todd Alquist, who has great respect for Walt. Lydia Rodarte-Quayle repeatedly demands that if Mike insists on killing her, that he leave her in her apartment so her daughter can find her, fearful she will think Lydia abandoned her. Much like Walt and Mike, Lydia seems to engage in the meth business in order to provide for her daughter, with actress Laura Fraser stating in an interview that Lydia's daughter is important to how "Lydia justified what she did to herself".

Pride
Pride/hubris is a major theme in Walter White's tragic character arc. In an interview with The Village Voice, showrunner Vince Gilligan identified the tipping point at which Walt "breaks bad" as his prideful decision not to accept Gretchen and Elliott Schwartz's offer to pay for his chemotherapy (season 1, episode 5):

The critically acclaimed episode "Ozymandias" references the Percy Bysshe Shelley poem of the same name, which describes the crumbling legacy of an overly prideful king. The episode draws parallels to the poem, as both antiheroes are left with little to show for their empire-building efforts. Austin Gill of Xavier University stated the episode "evokes the tyrannical aspirations of invincibility and arrogance of Ozymandias himself as represented in Shelley's poem." Douglas Eric Rasmussen of the University of Saskatchewan argued that the "concept of hubris and being punished for grandiose projects that serve an individual's egotism are central aspects of each work." Hank's death marks the beginning of a shift where it becomes increasingly difficult for Walt to continue to insist that he cooks meth for the sake of his family's well-being. By the series finale, Walt finally admits to Skyler that he became Heisenberg for his own ego: "I did it for me. I liked it. I was good at it."

Symbols

Pink teddy bear

A motif within the second season is the image of a damaged teddy bear and its missing eye. The teddy bear first appears at the end of the music video "Fallacies" for Jesse's band "TwaüghtHammër", which was released as a webisode in February 2009 leading to the second season. The teddy bear can also be spotted on the mural on Jane's bedroom wall during the final episode of the second season, further connecting the crash to Jane. It is seen in flashforwards during four episodes, the titles of which, when put together in order, form the sentence "Seven Thirty-Seven down over ABQ". The flashforwards are shot in black and white, with the sole exception of the pink teddy bear, which is an homage to the film Schindler's List, where the color red is used to distinguish the coat of a very young girl. At the end of the season, Walter indirectly helps cause the midair collision of two airplanes; the pink teddy bear is then revealed to have fallen out of one of the planes and into the Whites' swimming pool. Vince Gilligan called the plane accident an attempt to visualize "all the terrible grief that Walt has wrought upon his loved ones" and "the judgment of God".

In the first episode of the third season, Walt finds the teddy bear's missing eye in the pool skimmer. Television critic Myles McNutt has called it "a symbol of the damage [Walter] feels responsible for", and The A.V. Club commented that "the pink teddy bear continues to accuse." Fans and critics have compared the appearance of the teddy bear's face to an image of Gus Fring's face in the fourth-season finale.

The teddy bear prop was auctioned off, among other memorabilia, on September 29, 2013, the air date of the show finale.

Colors
A recurring symbol within Breaking Bad is the use of color, particularly the characters' color for wardrobe, being used to represent a character's state of mind or a relationship between characters or to foreshadow an event. In an interview with Vulture, Vince Gilligan says "Color is important on Breaking Bad; we always try to think in terms of it. We always try to think of the color that a character is dressed in, in the sense that it represents on some level their state of mind."

Walt Whitman
Walter White's name is reminiscent of the poet Walt Whitman. During the series, Gale Boetticher gives Walt a copy of Whitman's Leaves of Grass. Prior to giving this gift, Boetticher recites "When I Heard the Learn'd Astronomer". In the episode "Bullet Points", Hank finds the initials W.W. written in Boetticher's notes, and jokes with Walt that they are his initials, although Walt indicates that they must refer to Whitman.

In the episode "Hazard Pay", Walt finds the copy of Leaves of Grass as he is packing up his bedroom, briefly smiles, and leaves it out to read. This occurs at an especially high point in his life, when he feels that things are coming together and he is succeeding in all his ventures. A poem in the book, "Song of Myself", is based on many of these same feelings, furthering the connection between Walt's life and Whitman's poetry. The mid-season finale of season five, "Gliding Over All", is titled after poem 271 of Leaves of Grass. In the episode, Hank finds Leaves of Grass in Walt's bathroom and opens it to the cover page, where he reads the hand-written inscription: "To my other favorite W.W. It's an honour working with you. Fondly G.B." Upon reading this, Hank becomes visibly shocked, realizing the truth about Walter for the first time, which provides the opening premise for the second half of the final season.

Reception and legacy

Critical reception

Breaking Bad received widespread critical acclaim and has been praised by many critics as one of the greatest television shows of all time. On the review aggregator website Metacritic (using a scale of 0–100), the first season scored 73, the second 84, the third 89, the fourth 96, and the fifth 99. The American Film Institute listed Breaking Bad as one of the top ten television series of 2008, 2010, 2011, 2012 and 2013. In 2013, TV Guide ranked it as the ninth greatest TV series of all time. By its end, the series was among the most-watched cable shows on American television, with audience numbers doubling from the fourth season to the fifth. A 2015 survey by The Hollywood Reporter of 2,800 actors, producers, directors, and other industry people named Breaking Bad as their #2 favorite show. In 2016 and 2022, Rolling Stone ranked it third on its list of 100 Greatest TV Shows of All Time. In September 2019, The Guardian ranked the show fifth on its list of the 100 best TV shows of the 21st century, describing it as "The show that arguably killed off the antihero drama; nothing since has been able to top the depraved descent made by Walter White (a never-better Bryan Cranston), from milquetoast chemistry teacher to meth overlord, and few have dared to try." In 2021, Empire ranked Breaking Bad at number one on their list of The 100 Greatest TV Shows of All Time. Allen St. John of Forbes called it "The best TV show ever". In 2021, it was voted the third-best TV series of the 21st century by the BBC, as picked by 206 TV experts from around the world.

For the first season, the series saw a generally positive reception. New York Post critic Linda Stasi praised the series, particularly the acting of Cranston and Paul, stating "Cranston and Paul are so good, it's astounding. I'd say the two have created great chemistry, but I'm ashamed to say such a cheap thing." Robert Bianco of USA Today also praised Cranston and Paul, exclaiming "There is humor in the show, mostly in Walt's efforts to impose scholarly logic on the business and on his idiot apprentice, a role Paul plays very well. But even their scenes lean toward the suspenseful, as the duo learns that killing someone, even in self-defense, is ugly, messy work."

The second season saw critical acclaim. Entertainment Weekly critic Ken Tucker stated "Bad is a superlatively fresh metaphor for a middle-age crisis: It took cancer and lawbreaking to jolt Walt out of his suburban stupor, to experience life again—to take chances, risk danger, do things he didn't think himself capable of doing. None of this would work, of course, without Emmy winner Cranston's ferocious, funny selflessness as an actor. For all its bleakness and darkness, there's a glowing exhilaration about this series: It's a feel-good show about feeling really bad." San Francisco Chronicle Tim Goodman claimed "The first three episodes of Season 2 that AMC sent out continue that level of achievement with no evident missteps. In fact, it looks as if Gilligan's bold vision for Breaking Bad, now duly rewarded against all odds, has invigorated everyone involved in the project. You can sense its maturity and rising ambition in each episode." Horror novelist Stephen King lauded the series, comparing it to the likes of Twin Peaks and Blue Velvet.

The third season also saw critical acclaim. Time proclaimed, "It's a drama that has chosen the slow burn over the flashy explosion, and it's all the hotter for that choice." Newsday stated Breaking Bad was still TV's best series and it stayed true to itself. Tim Goodman praised the writing, acting, and cinematography, pointing out the "visual adventurousness" of the series. Goodman went on to call the show's visuals "a combination of staggering beauty – the directors make use of numerous wide-angle landscape portraits – and transfixing weirdness." After the finale aired, The A.V. Club said that season three was "one of television's finest dramatic accomplishments. And what makes it so exciting – what makes the recognition of the current golden age so pressing – is that the season has not been, as [another reviewer] put it in another context, 'television good.' The heart-in-the-throat quality of this season comes as much from the writers' exhilarating disregard for television conventions as from the events portrayed."

Season four won near-universal critical acclaim. The Boston Globe referred to the show as a "taut exercise in withheld disaster" and declared the show "riveting". The Pittsburgh Post-Gazette labeled the series "smart and thought provoking that elevates the artistic achievements of the medium". Season four was listed by many critics as one of the best seasons of television in 2011. Time listed Walter White's "I am the one who knocks" line as one of the best television lines of 2011. The Pittsburgh Post-Gazette listed it as the best series of 2011 while noting that "Breaking Bad is that rare TV series that has never made a seriously damaging storytelling misstep." The A.V. Club review of the finale summed it up as a "fantastically fitting end for a season that ran in slow motion, starting and continuing with so many crises begging for resolution week after week. Now the decks are cleared, but that doesn't mean anybody is home free. Nothing's ever easy on Breaking Bad." The reviewer continued to exalt the season, and proclaimed, "What a season of television – truly something none of us could ever have expected, or claimed we deserved."

Both halves of the fifth season received overwhelming critical acclaim. Following the end of the series, critic Nick Harley summarized his commendation of the show: "Expertly written, virtuosic with its direction, and flawlessly performed, Breaking Bad is everything you could want in a drama. Critics will spend the next decade dissecting and arguing about what made it great, but the reasons are endless and already well documented." During the final season, the show also received praise from George R. R. Martin, author of the A Song of Ice and Fire novels, particularly the episode "Ozymandias"; Martin commented that "Walter White is a bigger monster than anyone in Westeros." In his review of the second half of season 5, Seth Amitin of IGN stated, "This final batch of Breaking Bad is one of the best run of episodes TV has ever offered," and praised "Ozymandias" in particular, referring to it as "maybe the best episode of TV [he's] ever seen". Jonah Goldberg of National Review called it "the best show currently on television, and perhaps even the best ever". The veteran actor Sir Anthony Hopkins wrote a letter of praise to Bryan Cranston, telling him that his "performance as Walter White was the best acting I have seen – ever". He lauded the rest of the cast and crew as well. The letter first appeared on Steven Michael Quezada's (who portrayed DEA Agent Steven Gomez) Facebook page, and in spite of it being taken down, the letter soon went viral. In 2013, Guinness World Records named Breaking Bad the highest-rated TV series of all time, citing its season 5 Metacritic score of 99 out of 100.

Criticism
Breaking Bad has been accused by some members of law enforcement and the legal community of normalizing or glorifying methamphetamine creation and usage.

Viewership
Breaking Bad premiered on the same night as both the NFC and AFC Championships in the 2008 NFL playoffs, an intentional decision by AMC hoping to capture the adult male viewership immediately following the planned end of the NFC game. The game ran over its time slot, cutting into Breaking Bad timeslot in most of America. As a result, the pilot had only about 1.4 million viewers. Coupled with the ongoing writers strike, the first season did not draw as large of a viewership as they expected. However, with subsequent seasons, viewership increased, avoiding the usual trend of downward viewership that most serialized shows had. Ratings further increased by the fourth season as, prior to airing, the previous seasons had been added to Netflix, boosting interest in the show. Breaking Bad is considered the first such show to have a renewed burst of interest due to the show being made available on Netflix. The second half of the final season saw record viewership, with the series finale reaching over 10.3 million viewers.

Awards and nominations

The series received numerous awards and nominations, including 16 Primetime Emmy Awards and 58 nominations, including winning for Outstanding Drama Series in 2013 and 2014. It also won two Peabody Awards, one in 2008 and one in 2013.

For his portrayal of Walter White, Bryan Cranston won the Primetime Emmy Award for Outstanding Lead Actor in a Drama Series four times, in 2008, 2009, 2010, and 2014. Cranston also won the TCA Award for Individual Achievement in Drama in 2009 and the Satellite Award for Best Actor – Television Series: Drama in 2008, 2009, and 2010, as well as the Critics' Choice Television Award for Best Actor in a Drama Series and the Saturn Award for Best Actor on Television in 2012.

Aaron Paul won the Primetime Emmy Award for Outstanding Supporting Actor in a Drama Series in 2010, 2012, and 2014. Paul also won the Saturn Award for Best Supporting Actor on Television in 2010 and 2012. Anna Gunn won the Primetime Emmy Award for Outstanding Supporting Actress in a Drama Series in 2013 and 2014. For his work on season four, Giancarlo Esposito won the Critics' Choice Television Award for Best Supporting Actor in a Drama Series.

In 2010 and 2012, Breaking Bad won the TCA Award for Outstanding Achievement in Drama, as well as the TCA Award for Program of the Year in 2013. In 2009 and 2010, the series won the Satellite Award for Best Television Series – Drama, along with the Saturn Award for Best Syndicated/Cable Television Series in 2010, 2011, and 2012. The series won the Writers Guild of America Award for Television: Dramatic Series in both 2012 and 2013. In 2013, it was named No. 13 in a list of the 101 Best-Written TV Series of All Time by the Writers Guild of America and won, for the first time, the Primetime Emmy Award for Outstanding Drama Series. Overall, the show has won 110 industry awards and has been nominated for 262.

Retrospective conversations

Writers reunion

Variety held a Q&A with most of the original writing staff to reflect on the show's run, the final season, the writing process, and alternative endings. Along with creator Vince Gilligan, fellow writers and producers Peter Gould, Thomas Schnauz, Gennifer Hutchison, Moira Walley-Beckett, Sam Catlin and George Mastras joined to discuss memories from the show's humble beginnings, character transformations that concluded in the final season as well as surprising developments along the way. For instance, the character of Jesse Pinkman was originally supposed to die halfway through season one in a tragic drug deal gone horribly wrong. The reasoning behind this decision was that Jesse served his purpose "in a meat-and-potatoes, logistical sense. The character would give Walt his entrée into the business" before meeting his demise. However, this was eventually done away with as the story progressed beyond Gilligan's early scripts.

The writers also opened up on their collaborative process and how their form of storytelling evolved with the show. According to writer George Mastras,

The development of certain characters posed challenges. Skyler White became unsympathetic to some viewers in earlier seasons as she was often presented as an obstacle to Walt's ultimate agenda. The writers struggled to change the dynamic and realized that "the only way people were going to like Skyler was if she started going along with what Walt was doing." It was a tricky shift to alter on screen; the writers didn't want to betray her character. This led them to justify the change by using her past job as a bookkeeper to segue into her helping Walt launder his money. Breaking the individual episodes was another form of problem-solving for the writers. They stressed the importance of not letting the "master plan" stop them from staying true to the world they created. There came a point where tracking the characters on a moment-by-moment basis proved to be more useful rather than the general direction of the story. Peter Gould said they would always start with the last thought in a character's head. "Where's Jesse's head at? That was always the prelude to the breakthrough moment, because when you said that, it's usually because we had gotten attached to some big plan or some big set-piece that we thought had to be there, but the characters didn't want to do what we wanted them to do."

Rian Johnson's experience on the show

Director Rian Johnson worked on three episodes ("Fly", "Fifty-One" and "Ozymandias") and in an interview with IGN shared his memories from behind the camera. He shed some light on the process including the fact that he sat through "tone meetings" with Vince Gilligan. The two of them talked about every dramatic beat in a script, the distinct visual look of the show, and how the tonal shift of each scene had to feel natural while serving the main storyline of the particular episode. Johnson also revealed that he learned so much about working with actors because of his directing of Bryan Cranston and Aaron Paul, describing the experience as a "free masterclass."

When asked about the show's lasting legacy, Johnson offered up his thoughts,

Franchise

Breaking Bads success caused numerous spin-offs and a media franchise. This includes a spin-off prequel series, a Spanish-language adaptation, a sequel film, a talk show, and a video game.

Real-life influence
Several attempts to create a real restaurant concept after Los Pollos Hermanos have occurred, most notably in 2019, Family Style, Inc., a chain of restaurants in California, Nevada, and Illinois, which secured rights from Sony and with Gilligan's blessing to sell chicken dinners through Uber Eats under the name and branding "Los Pollos Hermanos" in a three-year deal.

Law enforcement authorities have reported occasional instances of seizing blue crystal methamphetamine in drug-related arrests and raids. The appearance of "blue meth" in real-world drug use has been attributed to Breaking Bad's popularity. In 2015, series creator Vince Gilligan publicly requested fans of the series to stop reenacting a scene from "Caballo sin Nombre" in which Walter angrily throws a pizza onto his own roof after Skyler refuses to let him inside; this came after complaints from the home's real-life owner.

Role reprisals
Beyond appearances in Better Call Saul and El Camino, Cranston reprised his role as Walter in a commercial for Esurance which aired during Super Bowl XLIX, one week before the premiere of Breaking Bad spin-off Better Call Saul. Another ad for PopCorners, featuring Cranston, Paul, and Cruz reprising their roles and directed by Gilligan, aired for Super Bowl LVII.

Tributes from Albuquerque
A Breaking Bad fan group placed a paid obituary for Walter White in the Albuquerque Journal, October 4, 2013. On October 19, 2013, a mock funeral procession (including a hearse and a replica of Walter's meth lab RV) and service for the character was held at Albuquerque's Sunset Memorial Park cemetery. A headstone was placed with a photo of Cranston as Walter. While some residents were unhappy with the makeshift gravesite for closure with the show, tickets for the event raised nearly $17,000 for a local charity called Healthcare for the Homeless.

Gilligan and Sony Television Pictures commissioned and donated a bronze statue of Walter and Jesse to the city of Albuquerque in July 2022, which is on display at the Albuquerque Convention Center.

New Mexico Law Review
In May 2015, the New Mexico Law Review published a collection of eight articles by legal scholars, each dedicated to dissecting legal issues presented by Breaking Bad. The articles discussed issues such as whether the attorney–client privilege would protect communications with Saul Goodman, and whether Walter White could have filed a lawsuit to force his way back into Gray Matter Technologies.

References

External links

  – official site at Sony Pictures
 
 
 Breaking Bad at Emmys.com
 

 
2000s American crime drama television series
2000s Western (genre) television series
2010s American crime drama television series
2010s Western (genre) television series
2010s American black comedy television series
2008 American television series debuts
2013 American television series endings
AMC (TV channel) original programming
2000s American black comedy television series
BAFTA winners (television series)
Best Drama Series Golden Globe winners
Cultural depictions of chemists
Drug Enforcement Administration in fiction
Emmy Award-winning programs
English-language television shows
Midlife crisis in television
New Mexico culture
Nonlinear narrative television series
Outstanding Performance by an Ensemble in a Drama Series Screen Actors Guild Award winners
Peabody Award-winning television programs
Primetime Emmy Award for Outstanding Drama Series winners
Primetime Emmy Award-winning television series
Saturn Award-winning television series
Serial drama television series
Television series about cancer
Television series about dysfunctional families
Television series about illegal drug trade
Television series about organized crime
Television series by Sony Pictures Television
Television series created by Vince Gilligan
Television series set in 2008
Television series set in 2009
Television series set in 2010
Television shows filmed in New Mexico
Television shows set in New Hampshire
Television shows set in New Mexico
Thriller television series
Works about Mexican drug cartels
Works about organized crime in the United States
Neo-Western television series